The Fighting Gringo is a 1939 Western film directed by David Howard and featuring George O'Brien, Lupita Tovar and  William Royle. The picture was produced under the RKO Pictures banner. Ben Johnson had a small uncredited early role as a Mexican barfly and did some work as a stuntman.

A copy is held at the Library of Congress.

Plot

Cast
 George O'Brien as Wade Barton 
 Lupita Tovar as Anita 'Nita' del Campo 
 Lucio Villegas as Don Aliso del Campo 
 William Royle as Ben Wallace 
 Glenn Strange as Rance Potter 
 Slim Whitaker as Monty Bates (as Slim Whittaker) 
 LeRoy Mason as John Courtney 
 Mary Field as Sandra Courtney 
 Martin Garralaga as Pedro, ranch foreman 
 Dick Botiller as Jose, del Campo Vaquero 
 Bill Cody as Sheriff Fred Warren (as Bill Cody Sr.) 
 Cactus Mack as Utah Jones 
 Chris-Pin Martin as Felipe, barber 
 Ben Johnson as Mexican barfly (uncredited) 
 Sid Jordan as Buck, stage driver (uncredited) 
 Forrest Taylor as Foreman of coroner's jury (uncredited)

See also
 The Fighting Gringo (1917 film)

References

External links
 
 
 
 

1939 films
American black-and-white films
1939 Western (genre) films
RKO Pictures films
Films directed by David Howard
American Western (genre) films
Films produced by Bert Gilroy
1930s American films